The Jameh Mosque of Babol is related to the Qajar dynasty and is located in Babol, near the cultural Intersection.

See also
 Islam in Iran

References

Mosques in Iran
Mosque buildings with domes
National works of Iran
Babol
Tourist attractions in Babol